Microsoft Lifechat is a brand of headsets created by Microsoft.

LifeChat headsets include headphones, and an attached noise-cancelling microphone.  Also included is a button to start voice conversations using Windows Live Messenger.

Wired headsets 
The LifeChat LX-3000 is a wired headset that connects to a PC by a USB cable. The headset features a microphone on an adjustable boom that can rotate up and down. The headset also has an in-line volume control switch with a mute button and a Windows Live Call button that activates voice calls in Microsoft Windows. The LX-3000 uses the CM108 USB audio chip from C-Media.

The LifeChat LX-2000 is a "behind-the-head" set of headphones with a microphone. It includes an in-line control box and a foldable design meant to reduce the size of the headset for travel.

The LifeChat LX-1000 is a very simple "over-the-head" set of headphones with a microphone. The microphone can only rotate up and down and is not as adjustable as the LX-2000 or the LX-3000. It was designed to be lightweight. This model also includes an in-line control box.

Wireless headsets 
The LifeChat ZX-6000 used 2.4 GHz wireless technology to connect, allowing a range of 30 feet.

The wireless receiver also allowed wireless Xbox 360 accessories to connect to the computer.

This model was discontinued.

References

External links 
 

Microsoft